The Ivica Matić Award is an award given by the Association of Film Workers of Bosnia and Herzegovina named after the Bosnian-Herzegovinian film director and screenwriter Ivica Matić.

History 

Until 1992, The Ivica Matić Award was given for contributions to film, but was interrupted because of the Bosnian War. It was re-established in 2003 and is awarded to members of the Association in two distinct categories of: Outstanding film work of the year and for the Total contribution to Bosnian-Herzegovinian cinema. The prize is awarded annually as a part of Sarajevo Film Festival program and is supported by Film Fund Sarajevo. Due to the COVID-19 pandemic awards for 2019 and 2020 were awarded in 2021.

Recent winners 
The recent winners of the Ivica Matić Award are:

 2003 – director Pierre Žalica for the film Burning Fire;
 2004 – director Srđan Vuletić for the film Summer in the Golden Valley;
 2005 – film worker Mensud Arslanović, awarded posthumously for his life's contribution;
 2006 – director Jasmila Žbanić for the film Grbavica and  Gavrilo Grahovac, Minister of the Federal Ministry of Culture and Sports for lifelong contribution;
 2007 – directors Gojko Šipovac and Vlatko Filipović for their lifelong contribution;
 2008 – director Aida Begić and producer and screenwriter Elma Tataragić for the film Snow;
 2009/2010 – director Vefik Hadžismajlović and film worker Aziz Arnautović for their overall contribution.
 2011 – Srđan Šarenac, director of the documentary Village Without Women, and  Pero Burić for his life contribution.
 2012 – Vera Mihić for her life contribution to Bosnian film and  the author team of the film Children (Erol Zbučević, Igor Čamo, Sanja Džeba, Sanda Popovac and Miralem Zubčević)
 2013 – Mustafa Mustafić for his life contribution to Bosnian-Herzegovinian film and  Danis Tanović for the film An Episode in the Life of an Iron Picker.
 2014 – Mirsad Purivatra, director of the Sarajevo Film Festival, and  producer Zoran Galić for overall contribution.
 2015 – Ademir Kenović, producer and director; producer Amra Bakšić Čamo and director of photography Erol Zubčević.
 2016 – Reginald Šimek, editor, Tomislav Topić, director of the Mediterranean Film Festival, and  members of the action group for copyright (Jovan Marjanović, Elma Tataragić, Pierre Žalica, Amar Nović)
 2017 – Director Alen Drljević and producer Damir Ibrahimović for the film Men Don't Cry,  Dragutin Ressner and  Nidžara Mehić for their life contribution.
 2018 – Project "Sarajevo City of Film", and director Vesko Kadić and  director of photography Milenko Uherka for his life contribution.
 2019 – Elma Tataragić for the screenwriting of Stiches by Miroslav Terzić (West End Productions) and God Exists, Her Name is Petrunya by Teona Strugar Mitevska (Sisters and Brother Mitevski); Nermin Hamzagić – director of Full Moon (SCCA/pro.ba) and for overall contribution: director, scriptwriter, cinematographer and producer Mustafa Kapidžić.
2020 – Damir Ibrahimović for the realization of Jasmila Žbanić's film Quo Vadis, Aida? (Deblokada), Igor Čamo – sound designer of Quo Vadis, Aida? and Focus, Grandma! by Pierre Žalica (Obala Art Centar) and for overall contribution: Director Ratko Orozović and cinematographer Danijal Šukalo.

References 

Bosnia and Herzegovina film awards